Tulagi, less commonly known as Tulaghi, is a small island——in Solomon Islands, just off the south coast of Ngella Sule. The town of the same name on the island (pop. 1,750) was the capital of the British Solomon Islands Protectorate from 1896 to 1942 and is today the capital of the Central Province.  The capital of what is now the state of Solomon Islands moved to Honiara, Guadalcanal, after World War II.

The island was originally chosen by the British as a comparatively isolated and healthier alternative to the disease-ridden larger islands of the Solomon Islands archipelago.

In October 2019, the government of Central Province signed a deal to grant the 75-year lease of the entire island of Tulagi to a Chinese company China Sam Enterprise Group. However, this was declared unconstitutional by the Solomon Islands parliament after a week and, consequently, the deal was cancelled.

Climate

History
The first recorded sighting by Europeans was by the Spanish expedition of Álvaro de Mendaña on 16 April 1568. More precisely the sighting was due to a local voyage done by a small boat, in the accounts the brigantine Santiago, commanded by Maestre de Campo Pedro Ortega Valencia and having Hernán Gallego as pilot.

World War II
The Japanese occupied Tulagi on May 3, 1942, with the intention of establishing a seaplane base nearby (see Japanese Tulagi landing).  The ships in Tulagi harbor were raided by planes from  the following day in a prelude to the Battle of the Coral Sea.

Allied forces, primarily the 1st Marine Raiders, landed on August 7 and captured Tulagi as part of Operation Watchtower after a day of hard fighting.

After its capture by United States Navy and Marine Corps forces, the island hosted a squadron of PT boats for a year, which included LTJG John F. Kennedy's PT-109 as well as other ancillary facilities. A small 20-bed dispensary was operated on Tulagi until its closure in 1946. The island also formed part of Purvis Bay, which hosted many US Navy ships during 1942 and 1943.

Postwar
The present-day Tulagi has a fishing fleet.

Scuba diving
Tulagi offers numerous scuba diving locations. The wrecks of USS Aaron Ward, USS Kanawha, and HMNZS Moa are close by, and the wrecks of Ironbottom Sound are not much further off, to the south and west. These three ships were all sunk in the same Japanese naval air raid, part of the Operation "I" on April 7, 1943.

Tulagi is developing a tourism industry based on scuba.

References

Former national capitals
Islands of the Solomon Islands
Populated places in Central Province (Solomon Islands)
Wreck diving sites